"I'll Be There for You/You're All I Need to Get By" is a duet song by the American rapper Method Man, and singer Mary J. Blige who sings the intro, the choruses, and backing vocals. The song is a remix of Method Man's "All I Need" which appeared on his 1994 debut album, Tical. All versions of this song contain an interpolation of Marvin Gaye & Tammi Terrell's hit, You're All I Need to Get By. Both this remix song and the original were produced by RZA. The remix song was released as a single and is also known as "I'll Be There for You/You're All I Need to Get By (Razor Sharp Mix)". The video for this remix song was directed by Diane Martel.

Another version of the remix was released for radio airplay, titled "I'll Be There for You/You're All I Need to Get By (Puff Daddy Mix)", which was produced by Sean "Puffy" Combs and Trackmasters. The Puff Daddy version of the song contains a new instrumental which includes a repeated sample from the Notorious B.I.G.'s "Me & My Bitch". The song sold over 800,000 copies and was certified platinum by the RIAA.

Overview and Legacy
The song (all versions) peaked at number 3 on the Billboard Hot 100 chart on June 3, 1995. The song reached number 1 on the R&B singles chart in the May 20, 1995 issue of Billboard Magazine, a position it held for three weeks. The song won the Grammy Award for Best Rap Performance by a Duo or Group in 1996. "I'll Be There for You/You're All I Need to Get By" appears on Radio 1 Established 1967, a compilation album celebrating the 40th anniversary of BBC Radio 1.

In 2008, the song was ranked number 44 on VH1's "100 Greatest Songs of Hip Hop" list.

In 2009, Method Man and Mary J. Blige performed the song together at VH1's 6th Annual Hip Hop Honors ceremony. The song is often cited as the first hybrid of what's now known as "Thug-Love" duets.

In 2012, Complex ranked the song number 1 on its list of "The 25 Best Hip-Hop Love Songs."

In a July 2012 interview with Complex magazine, Jean Claude "Poke" Olivier—one-half of the production team the Trackmasters —claimed they were the actual producers behind the "Puff Daddy" remix, but were never properly credited for it. The Trackmasters claim that they were only credited as session musicians for programming the drums while Combs was credited as the producer.

In 2019, Mary J. Blige performed "I'll Be There For You/You're All I Need to Get By" with Method Man during her BET Awards Lifetime Achievement Award performance which included a medley of songs and featured artists. CNN noted that the performance of the song "thrilled the crowd", who rapped along with Method Man's verses.

Track listings and formats
All original tracks produced by RZA 
US, CD Maxi-Single
 "I'll Be There For You/You're All I Need To Get By" (Puff Daddy Mix) — 5:08 a
 "I'll Be There For You/You're All I Need To Get By" (Puff Daddy Instrumental) — 5:04 
 "I'll Be There For You/You're All I Need To Get By" (Razor Sharp Mix) — 3:53 b
 "I'll Be There For You/You're All I Need To Get By" (Razor Sharp Instrumental) — 5:04
 "What The Blood Clot" (LP Version) — 3:25

UK, CD Maxi-Single
 "I'll Be There For You/You're All I Need To Get By" (Razor Sharp Mix) — 3:25 b
 "Bring The Pain" (Chemical Vocal) — 5:58 c
 "Release Yo'delf" (Prodigy Mix) — 5:55 d
 "Bring The Pain" (Chemical Instrumental) — 5:21 c

Germany, CD Maxi-Single
 "I'll Be There For You/You're All I Need To Get By" (Puff Daddy Mix) — 5:08 a
 "I'll Be There For You/You're All I Need To Get By" (Razor Sharp Mix) — 3:53 b
 "I'll Be There For You/You're All I Need To Get By" (LP Version) — 3:16 a
 "I'll Be There For You/You're All I Need To Get By" (Puff Daddy Instrumental) — 5:04
 "What The Blood Clot" (LP Version) — 3:25

a Remix production by Sean "Puffy" Combsb Remix production by Prince Rakeem "RZA"c Remix production by Chemical Brothersd Remix production by the Prodigye Remix production Trackmasters

Personnel
Method Man – Rap vocals
Mary J. Blige – Lead vocals, background vocals
RZA – Producer, remix producer
Puff Daddy – Remix producer
Trackmasters - Remix producer
Jeff Trotter – A&R
Drew Dixon – A&R

Charts

Weekly charts

Year-end charts

Decade-end charts

Certifications

See also
R&B number-one hits of 1995 (USA)

References

Further reading

External links

1995 songs
Mary J. Blige songs
Method Man songs
Music videos directed by Diane Martel
Male–female vocal duets
Songs written by Nickolas Ashford
Songs written by Valerie Simpson
Song recordings produced by RZA
Song recordings produced by Trackmasters
Def Jam Recordings singles
Songs written by Method Man
Songs written by RZA